The 1912 American Grand Prize was the seventh and final race of the 1912 Grand Prix season.  It was held at the Wauwatosa Road Race Course in Milwaukee, Wisconsin and was sanctioned by the Automobile Club of America.  Caleb Bragg won by over 15 minutes over Erwin Bergdoll.  Bragg's average speed was 68.397 mph (110.074 km/h).

The event was marred by the deaths of two-time and defending winner David Bruce-Brown and his mechanician Tony Scudellari in a practice accident.  Bruce-Brown's car was repaired by Barney Oldfield and driven to a fourth-place finish.  Ralph DePalma and his mechanician Tom Alley were injured when DePalma's Mercedes touched the rear of Bragg's Fiat and overturned, ejecting its occupants.

Classification

References 

American Grand Prize, 1912
Grand Prize
American Grand Prize
1910s in Milwaukee
October 1912 sports events
United States Grand Prix